The 2005 Uncle Tobys Hardcourts was a women's tennis tournament played on outdoor hard courts. It was the ninth edition of the event then known as the Uncle Tobys Hardcourts, and was a Tier III event on the 2005 WTA Tour. It took place in Gold Coast, Queensland, Australia, from 2 January through 8 January 2005. Second-seeded Patty Schnyder won the singles title and earned $27,000 first-prize money.

Finals

Singles

 Patty Schnyder defeated  Samantha Stosur, 1–6, 6–3, 7–5
 It was Schnyder's 1st singles title of the year and the 9th of her career.

Doubles

 Elena Likhovtseva /  Magdalena Maleeva defeated  Maria Elena Camerin /  Silvia Farina Elia, 6–3, 5–7, 6–1

External links
 ITF tournament edition details
 Tournament draws

 
Uncle Tobys Hardcourts
Brisbane International
Uncle Tobys Hardcourts
Uncle Tobys Hardcourts